The 1987 Atlanta AT&T Challenge of Champions was a tennis tournament in 1987. It was won by John McEnroe,6–4, 7–5 against Paul Annacone.

Players

Draw

Finals

Group A

Group B

References

1987 in sports in Georgia (U.S. state)
1987 in American tennis
Tennis tournaments in Georgia (U.S. state)